Filip Piszczek (born 26 May 1995) is a Polish professional footballer who plays as a forward and currently play for FC Imabari.

Club career
On 31 January 2020, he joined Italian Serie B club Trapani on loan.

On 25 February 2022, he moved to Jagiellonia Białystok on a half-a-year deal with a two-year extension option.

After an unsuccessful stint in Białystok, in July 2022 he signed for Japanese third division side FC Imabari.

Career statistics

Club

Honours
Cracovia
 Polish Cup: 2019–20
 Polish Super Cup: 2020

References

External links
 
 
 Filip Piszczek at FC Imabari

1995 births
Living people
Polish footballers
Sandecja Nowy Sącz players
Trapani Calcio players
MKS Cracovia (football) players
Jagiellonia Białystok players
FC Imabari players
I liga players
III liga players
Ekstraklasa players
People from Nowy Targ
Association football forwards
Polish expatriate footballers
Expatriate footballers in Italy
Expatriate footballers in Japan
Polish expatriate sportspeople in Italy
Polish expatriate sportspeople in Japan